Thirsk is a market town and civil parish in the Hambleton district of North Yorkshire, England known for its racecourse; quirky yarnbomber displays, and depiction as local author James Herriot's fictional Darrowby.

History

Archeological finds indicate there was a settlement in Thirsk around 500–600 BC. The town's name is derived from the Old Norse word þresk meaning fen or lake.

Thirsk is mentioned twice in the 1086 Domesday Book as Tresche, in the Yarlestre wapentake, a village with ten households. At the time of the Norman invasion the manor was split between Orm and Thor, local Anglo-Saxon landowners. Afterwards, it was split between Hugh, son of Baldric and the Crown.

House of Mowbray
Most of Thirsk was granted to a Robert from Montbray for whose descendant House of Mowbray the vale of Mowbray is named.

By 1145, what is now Old Thirsk, gained a Market charter giving it town and borough status. The remaining land in the parish was still under manorial rights.

The Mowbray family built a castle on the north side of Castlegate. It is not mentioned in the Domesday Book and an exact date is not recorded for construction but it was known to be completely destroyed by 1176 following an uprising against Henry II.

William de Mowbray, 6th Baron of Thirsk, 4th Baron Mowbray, was one of the 25 executors of the Magna Carta in 1215. The Mowbrays built a manor house on the old castle site, this was destroyed by the Scots in 1322. The manor itself continued to be in the Mowbrays possession, despite several claims, until the death of the 16th Lord Mowbray in 1476.

Berkeley and Derby
After the War of the Roses, Henry VII raised taxes, and that caused uprisings in the north. This led to the murder of Henry Percy, 4th Earl of Northumberland, on The Little Green, where he was sent to collect taxes, or in nearby South Kilvington.

With no direct succession, the daughter of Thomas de Mowbray, 1st Duke of Norfolk inherited the manor, who had married into the Berkeley family. Her son William de Berkeley, 1st Marquess of Berkeley inherited it on her death. For some years, the manor was held by Thomas Stanley Earl of Derby, whose successors held it after William's death until 1723.

Bell, Industrial Revolution and modern
In that year, it was sold by James Earl of Derby to Ralph Bell (MP) of Sowerby, "whose descendants thereafter held the manor". It remained in the Bell family into the 20th century.

Thirsk Hall in Kirkgate is a grade II* listed three-storey town house built in 1720 and extended in 1770 by York architect John Carr.

A 1767 Act of Parliament provided for building a navigable waterway to the town from the River Swale along Cod Beck. The project ran out of funds and was never completed, although remains can be seen of the wharf and a lock near Lock Bridge. The Thirsk Poor Law Union was formed in 1837 and covered a large part of the North Riding of Yorkshire. A workhouse was erected in Sutton Road in 1838.

There were 10 people killed and 43 injured. Another took place on 31 July 1967 on the East Coast Main Line. On that occasion an express train travelling north collided with a derailed freight train. Seven people were killed and 45 injured.

Governance

Thirsk has been in the Thirsk and Malton Parliamentary constituency since its creation for the 2010 general election. Kevin Hollinrake was elected MP at the 2015 UK general election.

The town was a parliamentary borough that had representation in 1295 and then from 1547 to 1885. For the majority of the latter period, it was represented by two members until 1882 when it was reduced to one member.

The constituency of Thirsk and Malton was originally created for the 1885 General Elections by the Redistribution of Seats Act of 1885 and existed until 1983. During that period it returned six Conservative party members to parliament, which included one by-election in 1915.

The Civil Parish of Thirsk was created by the Local Government Act 1894. The Local Government Act 1972 afforded Parish Councils the opportunity to change titles. Thirsk renamed itself a Town Council. In so doing, the Chairman was also renamed as Mayor. The council is represented by eleven Councillors. The town council meets at Thirsk and Sowerby Town Hall.

Geography

Thirsk is in the Vale of Mowbray and situated around the Cod Beck. Within Thirsk, Norby lies to the north-west, and Old Thirsk to the north-east. The separate parish of Sowerby abuts to the south.

Nearby villages with names of Danish origin, identified by the suffix by meaning village or farmstead, include Thirlby, Boltby and Borrowby.

Demography

The 1881 UK Census recorded the population of the parish as 3,337.

The parish had a population of 4,703 according to the 2001 Census.

The 2011 UK Census recorded the population as 4,998, an increase of 33% over the past 120 years, with a density of 3.9 people per hectare. Of the total population, 48.9% were male and 51.1% were female. The ethnic make up of the town was 94.3% White British, 3.0% Other White, 0.9% Asian British and 0.2% Black/Mixed and other Ethnic Groups. The religious composition of the town was 71.7% Christian, 27.4% None or no religion stated, 0.3% Muslim, 0.2% Buddhist, 0.1% Hindu, 0.1% Jewish and 0.0% Sikh.

Economy

Thirsk's medieval market place in the town centre hosts an open-air market each Monday and Saturday. The market was established in 1145 and remains a focal point for traders and visitors. Tourism and hospitality are major parts of the town's economy.

Severfield plc based on nearby former RAF Dalton, and VetUK are significant employers in the area.

Thirsk has a livestock auction market to the south-east of the town.

The town had a reputation for its leather tanning and saddlery trade, but by the 19th century was better known for the production of agricultural implements.

Culture

Thirsk Museum is operated by a team of volunteers in the house where Thomas Lord was born.

Ritz Cinema opened in 1912 and may be one of Britain's oldest operating cinemas.

The town's former courthouse has been an arts space since 1992.

The World of James Herriot is a visitor attraction in the former home and veterinary surgery of author James Herriot.

Photography for Pulp's Different Class album art was taken around Thirsk and includes shots of Thirsk Market Place, Hambleton Estate, Tesco's supermarket on Station Road, and  Ripon Way in nearby Carlton Miniott. Local children feature in pictures accompanying the work known for its track, Common People.

Transport

Bus services for York, Ripon, Northallerton and local villages stop in Thirsk market place.

The A61, passes through Thirsk market place. Since 1972 the A19 has bypassed Thirsk to the east of the town.

Education

The town has many primary schools, Thirsk Community Primary, the others being in adjoining Sowerby and All Saints RC Primary  School. It is within the catchment area of Thirsk School and Sixth Form College for secondary education. The current primary school was opened in 1979 with an extension added in 1991 to house extra classrooms, nursery section and medical facilities. Due to rises in the school population, some temporary build classrooms have also been erected on site. It is a mixed gender school catering for pupils between the ages of 3 and 11. It has a student capacity of 315 and as of 2013 was at 90.5% of that.

Religion

St Mary's Church is a Grade I listed, 15th-century church. There are gouges created by sharpening arrows and knives in the porch, and by the altar in the chancel.

The Friends Meeting House on Kirkgate that has been on that site since at least 1799.

In 1861 the Wesleyan Chapel on St James' Green was built.

A Roman Catholic Church dedicated to All Saints was added in 1867 on Castlegate.

Sport

Horse racing

Thirsk Racecourse is a thoroughbred horse racing venue consisting of a left handed oval of about one mile and two furlongs. The present course opened in 1923, but racing had taken place on the old course at nearby Black Hambleton over 200 years earlier. The racecourse serves flat racing in the spring and summer months.

Athletic Club

Thirsk Cricket Club was founded in 1851 and play in the middle of Thirsk Racecourse. The club was a founder member of the York & District League in which they still compete.

Thirsk Hockey Club have been affiliated to the Yorkshire Hockey Association since 1923. Until Thirsk School laid a floodlit, artificial pitch they played on grass pitches on the out field of the Cricket Club. They still share the Cricket Clubhouse for social facilities.

Football

Thirsk Falcons FC compete in the Teesside Football League, which is at the 13th level of the English football league system.

Rugby

Thirsk RUFC is a Rugby Union Club which competes in the Yorkshire Division 4 North West league.

Cycling

Thirsk was on the route of the Tour de Yorkshire in 2016 and 2018.

People

Mary Bateman (1768–1809), murderer and alleged witch

 John Bell (1809–1851), politician and lord of the manor who thought he was a bird.

 James Herriot (1916–1995), author of semi-autobiographical books about a veterinary surgeon's life.

 Jay Jopling (born 1963), art dealer credited with popularising the Young British Artists

 Thomas Lord (1755–1832), founded Lord's Cricket Ground

 Keith Robinson (born 1933), cricketer

 Georgia Steel (born 1998), television personality

See also

 Sowerby

 South Kilvington

 Carlton Miniott

References

External links
 
Thirsk Town Council website
Visit Thirsk website

 
Market towns in North Yorkshire
Civil parishes in North Yorkshire
Hambleton District
Towns in North Yorkshire